Radmila is a popular given female name in Serbia. It is derived from the Slavic words rada (the feminine of rade meaning "happiness") and mila ("sweet").

Nicknames 
Rada, Radka, Radushka, Radica, Lala, Mila, Mi

Famous bearers 
Radmila Bakočević (born 1933), Serbian operatic soprano with a major international opera career from 1955 to 1982
Radmilla Cody (born 1975), Navajo/Diné singer and indigenous rights activist
Radmila Drljača (born 1959), Yugoslav handball player
Radmila Hrustanović (born 1952), Serbian politician
Radmila Karaklajić (born 1939), Serbian singer and actress
Radmila "Rada" Manojlović (born 1985), Serbian pop folk singer
Radmila Miljanić-Petrović (born 1988), Montenegrin handball player
Radmila Perišić (born 1980), Serbian judoka
Radmila Šekerinska (born 1972), Macedonian politician and Defense Minister
Radmila Savić (born 1961), Yugoslav handball player
Radmila Šekerinska (born 1972), leader of the Social Democratic Union of Macedonia
Radmila Smiljanić (born 1940), Serbian opera singer
Radmila Vasileva (born 1964), Bulgarian basketball player

See also
 Slavic names

Slavic feminine given names
Bosnian feminine given names
Bulgarian feminine given names
Croatian feminine given names
Macedonian feminine given names
Montenegrin feminine given names
Serbian feminine given names